SouthPeak Interactive Corporation, doing business as SouthPeak Games, was an American video game publisher based in Midlothian, Virginia. Founded on March 1, 1996, as a subsidiary of SAS Institute in Cary, North Carolina, it was sold and moved to Midlothian, Virginia in 2000, and became a public company in 2008. Also in 2008, the company acquired and closed Austin, Texas-based publisher Gamecock Media Group, and opened a separate digital distribution subsidiary 7Sixty in Grapevine, Texas in 2011. SouthPeak Games quietly disappeared from the public eye in July 2013.

History

Foundation and sale (1996–2005) 
SouthPeak Games was founded as SouthPeak Interactive LLC on March 1, 1996, as a subsidiary of SAS Institute. Both companies were headquartered in Cary, North Carolina. SAS Institute's executive vice-president and chief technology officer, Armistead Sapp, was appointed as the new company's president. In 1997, SouthPeak Games signed a deal with Red Storm Entertainment that would grant them the exclusive license to distribute all of their upcoming titles, which was, however, terminated by Red Storm Entertainment in April 2000. In March 1999, SouthPeak Games acquired the license to develop games based on the Wild Wild West film. As result of the sale, all assets related to SouthPeak Games were moved the Midlothian location, while all staff at the Cary location were laid off or re-employed directly by SAS Institute. The company in its new location was legally registered as SouthPeak Interactive, L.L.C. on October 19, 2000. In August 2005, Melanie Mroz was appointed executive vice-president of SouthPeak Games.

Acquisitions (2005–2009) 
On January 16, 2008, SouthPeak Games acquired public company Global Services Partners Acquisition Corp. Through that transaction, SouthPeak Games performed a reverse merger takeover, and thus merged itself into GSPAC to form a new public entity titled SouthPeak Interactive Corporation, with Mroz becoming president and chief executive officer, and Phillips becoming chairman. On June 19, 2008, the company announced that they had raised a total of  through private investment in public equity, in order to expand its business. On October 14, 2008, the company announced that it had acquired Austin, Texas-based video game publisher Gamecock Media Group, including its upcoming titles, Legendary, Mushroom Men, and Velvet Assassin. Gamecock Media Group was initially made a publishing subsidiary, however, it was closed shortly after. In August 2009, SouthPeak Games started facing legal issues with work-for-hire vendors who had worked on games published by Gamecock Media Group, accusing SouthPeak Games of not paying outstanding royalties, although SouthPeak Games had already acknowledged these issues when they acquired Gamecock Media Group.

Lawsuits (2009–2011) 
In response, SouthPeak Games filed a counterclaim against TimeGate Studios, stating that they willingly shipped a game of poor quality in order to negatively manipulated the product's sales, seeking  in damages.

In November 2009, SouthPeak Games lost a legal battle to German distributor CDV Software, which concerned the failure to deliver three out of four unspecified games before Christmas 2008, and was ordered to pay . Additionally, on February 19, 2010, the judge ruled upon CDV Software's other claims, including copyright infringement and breach of contract, ordering SouthPeak Games to hand in further, undisclosed payments. Mid-issue, on April 8, 2010, Reba McDermott was appointed chief financial officer, replacing Melanie Mroz, who previously served that role interimly, but saw her appointment terminated nine months later. As a result of the outstanding bills, on July 20, 2010, British distributor Centresoft put 40,000 units of SouthPeak Games stock on ice to auction them off, generating  by August 6, 2010. The legal issue was announced to be resolved on October 14, 2010, and CDV Software dropped all charges against SouthPeak Games on November 10, 2010. However, all payments ordered by the settlement court were not paid by SouthPeak Games, as a result of which CDV Software filed for preliminary insolvency on April 15, 2010.

In June 2010, American publisher Majesco Entertainment announced the upcoming release of My Baby 3 & Friends, the third entry in the My Baby franchise, of which the first two were published by SouthPeak Games. In response to the announcement, on July 21, 2010, SouthPeak Games sued Majesco over copyright infringement over the My Baby intellectual property, despite its developer, French studio Nobilis, actually owning it at the time. Five days later, on July 26, 2010, Nobilis responded to the accusation, citing withunder SouthPeak Games' failure to pay royalties as reason to switch to Majesco and cease operations with SouthPeak Games. Due to damages caused by the legal issue, SouthPeak Games halted the distribution of all released titles in the My Baby series, namely, My Baby Boy, My Baby Girl, and My Baby First Steps on October 13, 2010. It was reported on January 10, 2011, that SouthPeak Games had won against Majesco and Nobilis, with the Lyon Commercial Court stating that Nobilis had no legal basis for ceasing operations with SouthPeak Games, wherefore all rights to there series were returned to SouthPeak Games.

In November 2010, the U.S. Securities and Exchange Commission (SEC) issued cease and desist orders against Phillips, Mroz, and SouthPeak Games for submitting incorrect SEC filings, which SouthPeak Games later stated to have been an error.

7Sixty, closure (2011–2013) 
On July 12, 2011, SouthPeak Games opened a new digital distribution subsidiary, 7Sixty LLC, in Grapevine, Texas. Led by vice president of publishing Leslie House and vice president of interactive entertainment Jeff Hutchinson, the studio was established in order to expand SouthPeak Games' business strategies to cover the digital market, with their first title to be Stronghold 3. Stronghold 3, released on October 25, 2011, would become the last game published by SouthPeak Games or 7Sixty, and both companies left the public eye in July 2013.

Games published

References 

 
Companies traded over-the-counter in the United States
Video game companies established in 1996
Video game companies disestablished in 2013
Defunct video game companies of the United States
Video game publishers
Defunct companies based in Virginia
1996 establishments in North Carolina
2013 disestablishments in North Carolina